Chłapowski (feminine: Chłapowska; plural: Chłapowscy) is a Polish surname. It may refer to:

 Antonio Chłapowski (born 1943), Polish-Swedish sportsperson
 Dezydery Chłapowski (1788–1879), Polish general, businessman and political activist
 Chłapowski Landscape Park, named after Dezydery Chłapowski

See also
 

Polish-language surnames